The Zoo de La Flèche (formally Parc Zoologique du Tertre-Rouge) is a  zoo that opened in 1946 in La Flèche, Sarthe, France.

The zoo is home to some 1600 animals representing about 160 species, and is a member of the European Association of Zoos and Aquaria (EAZA) and the Association Française des Parcs Zoologiques (AFdPZ).

External links

 (in French)

Zoos in France
Buildings and structures in Sarthe
Zoos established in 1946
Tourist attractions in Sarthe
Organizations based in Pays de la Loire